René Fallet (4 December 1927 – 25 July 1983) was a 20th-century French writer.

He wrote a novel that the 1981 film La Soupe aux choux was later based on.

Selected filmography
 The Love of a Woman (1953)
 Monsieur Robinson Crusoe (1960)

1927 births
1983 deaths
People from Villeneuve-Saint-Georges
20th-century French novelists
Cycling journalists
20th-century French screenwriters
Prix Interallié winners